Krishmar Santokie (born 20 December 1984) is a cricketer who plays for Jamaica and has represented the West Indies at international Twenty20 level. He bowls left-arm medium pace and is a lower order batsman.

Domestic career
He represented the Guyana Amazon Warriors in the Caribbean Premier League in 2013.

His slingy action & ability to deliver deceiving slower balls has made him an asset to T20 teams. Santokie spent a number of years playing in England for Farnham Royal cricket club where he used the English conditions to perfect his swing bowling technique which has continued with him into his international career.

He played for the Mumbai Indians in the 2014 Indian Premier League tournament.

Santokie came under scrutiny in December 2019 while playing for the Sylhet Thunder of the BPL when he overstepped on a delivery by a significant distance. The BCB launched an investigation shortly after the event. As of December, 2019, Santokie's career Twenty20 bowling average of 17.09 was the best by a West Indian, 18th best of active cricketers and 28th best of all time.

International career
His debut for the West Indies came in a Twenty20 International against England in September 2011, he finished with bowling figures of 1/17 in a West Indies victory.

Despite having the fourth lowest T20I bowling average of all time (15.44) and the 28th best economy rate (6.80), Santokie only played 12 matches for the West Indies before being dropped at age 29 in 2014. In his T20I career, he did not score any runs from his twelve matches, only batting once.

References

1984 births
Living people
West Indies Twenty20 International cricketers
Jamaica cricketers
Jamaican cricketers
Guyana Amazon Warriors cricketers
Khulna Tigers cricketers
People from Clarendon Parish, Jamaica
Comilla Victorians cricketers
St Kitts and Nevis Patriots cricketers
Jamaica Tallawahs cricketers
Sylhet Strikers cricketers
Jamaican people of Indian descent